New York hardcore (also known as NYHC) is both the hardcore punk music created in New York City and the subculture and lifestyle associated with that music. New York hardcore grew out of the hardcore scene established in Washington, D.C., by bands such as Bad Brains and Minor Threat. Initially a local phenomenon of the 1980s and 1990s, New York hardcore eventually grew to establish an international reputation with little to moderate mainstream popularity but with a dedicated and enthusiastic underground following, primarily in Europe and the United States. With a history spanning over more than four decades, many of the early New York hardcore bands are still in activity to this day. Some of them (including the Cro-Mags, Sick of It All, Agnostic Front and Murphy's Law) have been continuously or almost continuously active since their formation as well as having reunion shows.

Music

Origins

The origins of New York's punk rock scene can be traced back to such sources as late 1960s trash culture and an early 1970s underground rock movement centered on the Mercer Arts Center in Greenwich Village, where the New York Dolls performed. In early 1974, this early punk scene began to develop around the CBGB club, also in lower Manhattan, featuring groups and musicians like Television, Richard Hell, Patti Smith, the Ramones the Heartbreakers and Jayne County The New York hardcore scene particularly grew of out of the section of this punk scene that was documented on the 1982 New York Thrash compilation, with groups like the Stimulators, the Eliminators and the Mad.

After the breakup of the Eliminators, the band's bass player Vinnie Stigma formed Agnostic Front. The band soon became the godfathers of New York Hardcore and one of the scene's most crucial band. Around the same time the term "hardcore" started being used instead of "punk rock". Roger Miret of Agnostic Front asserts that "We started using the term 'hardcore' because we wanted to separate ourselves from the punk scene that was happening in New York at the time ... We were rougher kids living in the streets. It had a rougher edge". The scene emerged around 1981, when members of Agnostic Front, Cause for Alarm, Kraut, Murphy's Law and Antidote began to spend time together on Avenue A and performing at A7 in Manhattan. Rock clubs like Max's Kansas City, the Ritz and CBGB's also quickly became crucial spots for this newly formed scene.

Developments
New York City would come to play a central role in the development of hardcore. In 1981 the Bad Brains moved from DC to New York and an important scene finally emerged, this is regarded a key point in NYHC as the Bad Brains had an enormous impact on local bands at the time. Besides the main influences of Bad Brains, Minor Threat and the Los Angeles punk scene; New Jersey horror punk band The Misfits as well as midwest groups Necros and especially Negative Approach are also regarded as early influences on the NYHC scene and the development of a rawer and more aggressive hardcore sound. Early NYHC skinhead bands like the Cro-Mags and Agnostic Front were also heavily influenced by Oi! music as well as English punk bands like The Clash. 

In the late-1980s, many clubs, namely CBGB began to refuse to book hardcore bands to perform, due to the increasing violence and gang behavior that was present at them. This also led many long time members of the scene to depart.

Crossover period

After the release of Metallica's 1983 debut album Kill 'Em All, New York hardcore bands began embracing elements of heavy metal music, especially thrash metal. This event caused the scene to expand, with the average attendance at shows jumping from around 100 to over 400. One of the earliest New York hardcore bands to embrace heavy metal influences was NYC Mayhem. In the following years many crossover thrash bands began to form within the scene, notably Leeway, Crumbsuckers and Nuclear Assault. New York metal bands like Anthrax and Carnivore began attending and performing at hardcore shows, and many original NYHC bands became increasingly heavier and harder in sound as the metal influences grew stronger, consequently some NYHC bands who were previously skinheads started growing their hair and adopting metal looks. Agnostic Front released the crossover album Cause for Alarm in 1986, which led many in the scene to deride them as sell outs. Writer Freddie Alva stated in a 2014 article that "[Cause for Alarm's] combination of heavy metal precision and hardcore energy created a landmark for the crossover sound".

The Cro-Mags released the crossover album, Best Wishes in 1989, which also heavily impacted the scene. The album was cited as a major influence by much of the 1990s New York hardcore scene, particularly Biohazard, Merauder and Candiria.

Youth crew

Youth crew was a movement that began in the mid-to-late 1980s as a reaction against the metal influences being embraced in New York hardcore. Youth crew bands began playing a sound that called back to earlier punk rock–leaning hardcore acts. The movement was fronted by Youth of Today, who coined the name on their 1985 song "Youth Crew". Gorilla Biscuits and Bold were also prominent bands in the style. Straight edge and vegetarianism were also defining features of this movement, however this led to many older members of the scene rejecting the movement. Because of this, New York youth crew became an isolated entity separate from the wider hardcore scene. From within the youth crew scene, emerged bands like Sick of It All and Warzone, who did not necessarily adhere to all of its elements but would prove influential to many subsequent hardcore bands. Later youth crew bands, namely Judge, began to take heavily from metal, helping to lead to the development of heavy hardcore. New York youth crew began to decline in popularity and prominence following the 1988 Tompkins Square Park riot and 1990 departure of Ray Cappo from Youth of Today.

1990s
Early 1990s bands like Merauder, Darkside NYC and Confusion incorporated strong thrash and death metal leanings, pioneering an early metalcore sound; other second generation groups like Biohazard, Madball, Skarhead and 25 Ta Life were heavily influenced by hip-hop music, an influence which permeated through most of the mid to late 1990s NYHC scene. At this time, the scene was primarily based around the Bond Street Café on Bond Street, Manhattan. By 1993, Brownies, Coney Island High and the Wetlands Preserve became frequented venues, and CBGB recommenced hosting Sunday matinees.

In the mid-1990s, the New York hardcore scene expanded outward into much of the New York metropolitan area and New York state, which gave rise to Vision of Disorder, Crown of Thornz and No Redeeming Social Value.

Influence, aesthetics, ideology and social impact

The "New York hardcore logo" is a symbol attached to the scene which features the letters "NYHC" within the quadrants of an X shape. The symbol was created by the Abused vocalist Kevin Crowley.

Since its early stages, New York hardcore has been heavily associated with hardcore skinhead culture (unrelated to neo-Nazi skinheads), gang ideology and tattoo culture as well as squatting. In the mid to late 1980s, Youth Crew ideology and graffiti culture started to make an impact on the scene and had a long-lasting influence on the genre. Critics and observers have also noted an inspiration and influence from gritty, urban and/or dystopian films such as Death Wish, Taxi Driver, The Warriors, and Escape From New York. Historically, political stances in New York Hardcore have been varied and sometimes controversial. Some of the mid-1980s NYHC groups were aligned with right-wing ideology and had strong stances on immigration and patriotism, all the while openly condemning racism and nazism. There were also leftist groups associated with the scene such as Born Against and Nausea. Beginning with Cro-Mags and inspired by the spirituality of the Bad Brains, some groups also followed the International Society for Krishna Consciousness. By the mid-1990s, NYHC became an international phenomenon with prominent bands all over the globe being heavily influenced by the genre, such as Integrity from Cleveland, Strife from Los Angeles, Hatebreed from Connecticut, and Cold As Life from Detroit; an important scene also emerged in europe with Kickback from France, Ryker's from Germany, Arkangel from Belgium and Backfire from Netherlands, amongst many others.

Sam McPheeters argues that:

Hare Krishna

Many New York hardcore musicians are followers of the Gaudiya Vaishnavism religious organisation the International Society for Krishna Consciousness (ISKCON). Although some hardcore punk bands had already made references to Krishna Consciousness in the 1980s, the religion was most prominent through bands established in the early 1990s by the bands Shelter and 108. One of the first members of its scene to adopt Krishna Consciousness was John Joseph of the Cro-Mags. New York bands Antidote and Cause for Alarm were among the first that began to explore Krishna Consciousness in both their creative and personal lives, The main influence to on many musicians to embrace ISKCON was the Washington D.C.'s hardcore band the Bad Brains which, despite being Rastas, they "grafted fervent spirituality onto an otherwise nihilistic and antitranscendental genre."

See also
Blackout Records
Crossover thrash
Heavy hardcore
List of New York hardcore bands
Metalcore
Moshing
Music of New York City
No Wave
Straight edge
Youth crew
Hardcore skinhead

References

External links
Spiritribe webzine interviews and photos

Hardcore punk
Music of New York City
Music scenes
American rock music genres